Axel Strand (13 November 1893 in Burlöv – 13 September 1983 in Stockholm) was a Swedish trade union organizer. A carpenter by profession, he belonged to the Swedish Wood Industry Workers' Union. Strand was the chairman of the Swedish Trade Union Confederation 1947–1956.

References

1893 births
1983 deaths
People from Burlöv Municipality
Swedish trade unionists
Members of the Första kammaren